Chikungunya is an infection caused by the Chikungunya virus (CHIKV). Symptoms include fever and joint pains. These typically occur two to twelve days after exposure. Other symptoms may include headache, muscle pain, joint swelling, and a rash. Symptoms usually improve within a week; however, occasionally the joint pain may last for months or years. The risk of death is around 1 in 1,000. The very young, old, and those with other health problems are at risk of more severe disease.

The virus is spread between people by two types of mosquitos: Aedes albopictus and Aedes aegypti. They mainly bite during the day. The virus may circulate within a number of animals including birds and rodents. Diagnosis is by either testing the blood for the virus's RNA or antibodies to the virus. The symptoms can be mistaken for those of dengue fever and Zika fever. It is believed most people become immune after a single infection.

The best means of prevention is overall mosquito control and the avoidance of bites in areas where the disease is common. This may be partly achieved by decreasing mosquito access to water and with the use of insect repellent and mosquito nets. There is no vaccine and no specific treatment as of 2016. Recommendations include rest, fluids, and medications to help with fever and joint pain.

While the disease typically occurs in Africa and Asia, outbreaks have been reported in Europe and the Americas since the 2000s. In 2014 more than a million suspected cases occurred. In 2014 it was occurring in Florida in the continental United States but as of 2016 there were no further locally acquired cases. The disease was first identified in 1952 in Tanzania. The term is from the Kimakonde language and means "to become contorted".

Signs and symptoms
Around 85% of people infected with Chikungunya virus experience symptoms, typically beginning with a sudden high fever above . The fever is soon followed by severe muscle and joint pain. Pain usually affects multiple joints in the arms and legs, and is symmetric – i.e. if one elbow is affected, the other is as well. People with Chikungunya also frequently experience headache, back pain, nausea, and fatigue. Around half of those affected develop a rash, with reddening and sometimes small bumps on the palms, foot soles, torso, and face. For some, the rash remains constrained to a small part of the body; for others, the rash can be extensive, covering more than 90% of the skin. Some people experience gastrointestinal issues, with abdominal pain and vomiting. Others experience eye problems, namely sensitivity to light, conjunctivitis, and pain behind the eye. This first set of symptoms – called the "acute phase" of Chikungunya – lasts around a week, after which most symptoms resolve on their own.

Many people continue to have symptoms after the "acute phase" resolves, termed the "post-acute phase" for symptoms lasting three weeks to three months, and the "chronic stage" for symptoms lasting longer than three months. In both cases, the lasting symptoms tend to be joint pains: arthritis, tenosynovitis, and/or bursitis. If the affected person had pre-existing joint issues, these tend to worsen. Overuse of a joint can result in painful swelling, stiffness, nerve damage, and neuropathic pain. Typically the joint pain improves with time; however, the chronic stage can last anywhere from a few months to several years.

Joint pain is reported in 87–98% of cases, and nearly always occurs in more than one joint, though joint swelling is uncommon. Typically the affected joints are located in both arms and legs. Joints are more likely to be affected if they have previously been damaged by disorders such as arthritis. Pain most commonly occurs in peripheral joints, such as the wrists, ankles, and joints of the hands and feet as well as some of the larger joints, typically the shoulders, elbows and knees. Pain may also occur in the muscles or ligaments. In more than half of cases, normal activity is limited by significant fatigue and pain. Infrequently, inflammation of the eyes may occur in the form of iridocyclitis, or uveitis, and retinal lesions may occur. Temporary damage to the liver may occur.

People with Chikungunya occasionally develop neurologic disorders, most frequently swelling or degeneration of the brain, inflammation or degeneration of the myelin sheaths around neurons, Guillain–Barré syndrome, acute disseminated encephalomyelitis, hypotonia (in newborns), and issues with visual processing. In particularly rare cases, people may develop behavioral changes, seizures, irritation of the cerebellum or meninges, oculomotor nerve palsy, or paralysis of the eye muscles.

Newborns are susceptible to particularly severe effects of Chikungunya infection. Signs of infection typically begin with fever, rash, and swelling at the extremities. Around half of newborns have a mild case of the disease that resolves on its own; the other half have severe disease with inflammation of the brain and seizures. In severe cases, affected newborns may also have issues with bleeding and bloodflow, and problems with heart function.

In addition to newborns, the elderly, and those with diabetes, heart disease, liver and kidney diseases, and human immunodeficiency virus infection tend to have more severe cases of Chikungunya. Around 1 to 5 in 1,000 people with symptomatic Chikungunya die of the disease.

Cause

Virology

Chikungunya virus (CHIKV), is a member of the genus Alphavirus, and family Togaviridae. It was first isolated in 1953 in Tanzania and is an RNA virus with a positive-sense single-stranded genome of about 11.6kb. It is a member of the Semliki Forest virus complex and is closely related to Ross River virus, O'nyong'nyong virus, and Semliki Forest virus. Because it is transmitted by arthropods, namely mosquitoes, it can also be referred to as an arbovirus (arthropod-borne virus). In the United States, it is classified as a category B priority pathogen, and work requires biosafety level III precautions.

Transmission
Chikungunya is generally transmitted from mosquitoes to humans. Less common modes of transmission include vertical transmission, which is transmission from mother to child during pregnancy or at birth. Transmission via infected blood products and through organ donation is also theoretically possible during times of outbreak, though no cases have yet been documented. The incubation period ranges from one to twelve days, and is most typically three to seven.

Chikungunya is related to mosquitoes, their environments, and human behavior. The adaptation of mosquitoes to the changing climate of North Africa around 5,000 years ago made them seek out environments where humans stored water. Human habitation and the mosquitoes' environments were then very closely connected. During periods of epidemics humans are the reservoir of the virus. Because high amounts of virus are present in the blood in the beginning of acute infection, the virus can be spread from a viremic human to a mosquito, and back to a human. During other times, monkeys, birds and other vertebrates have served as reservoirs. Three genotypes of this virus have been described, each with a distinct genotype and antigenic character: West African, East/Central/South African, and Asian genotypes. The Asian lineage originated in 1952 and has subsequently split into two lineages – India (Indian Ocean Lineage) and South East Asian clades. This virus was first reported in the Americas in 2014. Phylogenetic investigations have shown that there are two strains in Brazil – the Asian and East/Central/South African types – and that the Asian strain arrived in the Caribbean (most likely from Oceania) in about March 2013. The rate of molecular evolution was estimated to have a mean rate of 5 × 10−4 substitutions per site per year (95% higher probability density 2.9–7.9 × 10−4).

Chikungunya is spread through bites from Aedes mosquitoes, and the species A. aegypti was identified as the most common vector, though the virus has recently been associated with many other species, including A. albopictus. Research by the Pasteur Institute in Paris has suggested Chikungunya virus strains in the 2005-2006 Reunion Island outbreak incurred a mutation that facilitated transmission by the Asian tiger mosquito (A. albopictus). Other species potentially able to transmit Chikungunya virus include Ae. furcifer-taylori, Ae. africanus, and Ae. luteocephalus.

Mechanism
Chikungunya virus is passed to humans when a bite from an infected mosquito breaks the skin and introduces the virus into the body.  The pathogenesis of chikungunya infection in humans is still poorly understood, despite recent outbreaks. It appears that in vitro, Chikungunya virus is able to replicate in human epithelial and endothelial cells, primary fibroblasts, and monocyte-derived macrophages. Viral replication is highly cytopathic, but susceptible to type-I and -II interferon. In vivo, in studies using living cells, chikungunya virus appears to replicate in fibroblasts, skeletal muscle progenitor cells, and myofibers.

The type-1 interferon response seems to play an important role in the host's response to chikungunya infection. Upon infection with chikungunya, the host's fibroblasts produce type-1 alpha and beta interferon (IFN-α and IFN-β). In mouse studies, deficiencies in INF-1 in mice exposed to the virus cause increased morbidity and mortality. The chikungunya-specific upstream components of the type-1 interferon pathway involved in the host's response to chikungunya infection are still unknown. Nonetheless, mouse studies suggest that IPS-1 is an important factor, and that IRF3 and IRF7 are important in an age-dependent manner. Mouse studies also suggest that chikungunya evades host defenses and counters the type-I interferon response by producing NS2, a nonstructural protein that degrades RBP1 and turns off the host cell's ability to transcribe DNA. NS2 interferes with the JAK-STAT signaling pathway and prevents STAT from becoming phosphorylated.

In the acute phase of chikungunya, the virus is typically present in the areas where symptoms present, specifically skeletal muscles, and joints. In the chronic phase, it is suggested that viral persistence (the inability of the body to entirely rid itself of the virus), lack of clearance of the antigen, or both, contribute to joint pain. The inflammation response during both the acute and chronic phase of the disease results in part from interactions between the virus and monocytes and macrophages. Chikungunya virus disease in humans is associated with elevated serum levels of specific cytokines and chemokines. High levels of specific cytokines have been linked to more severe acute disease: interleukin-6 (IL-6), IL-1β, RANTES, monocyte chemoattractant protein 1 (MCP-1), monokine induced by gamma interferon (MIG), and interferon gamma-induced protein 10 (IP-10). Cytokines may also contribute to chronic Chikungunya virus disease, as persistent joint pain has been associated with elevated levels of IL-6 and granulocyte-macrophage colony-stimulating factor (GM-CSF). In those with chronic symptoms, a mild elevation of C-reactive protein (CRP) has been observed, suggesting ongoing chronic inflammation. However, there is little evidence linking chronic Chikungunya virus disease and the development of autoimmunity.

Viral replication

The virus consists of four nonstructural proteins and three structural proteins. The structural proteins are the capsid and two envelope glycoproteins: E1 and E2, which form heterodimeric spikes on the viron surface. E2 binds to cellular receptors in order to enter the host cell through receptor-mediated endocytosis. E1 contains a fusion peptide which, when exposed to the acidity of the endosome in eukaryotic cells, dissociates from E2 and initiates membrane fusion that allows the release of nucleocapsids into the host cytoplasm, promoting infection. The mature virion contains 240 heterodimeric spikes of E2/E1, which after release, bud on the surface of the infected cell, where they are released by exocytosis to infect other cells.

Diagnosis
Chikungunya is diagnosed on the basis of clinical, epidemiological, and laboratory criteria. Clinically, acute onset of high fever and severe joint pain would lead to suspicion of chikungunya. Epidemiological criteria consist of whether the individual has traveled to or spent time in an area in which chikungunya is present within the last twelve days (i.e.) the potential incubation period). Laboratory criteria include a decreased lymphocyte count consistent with viremia. However a definitive laboratory diagnosis can be accomplished through viral isolation, RT-PCR, or serological diagnosis.

The differential diagnosis may include other mosquito-borne diseases, such as dengue or malaria, or other infections such as influenza. Chronic recurrent polyarthralgia occurs in at least 20% of chikungunya patients one year after infection, whereas such symptoms are uncommon in dengue.

Virus isolation provides the most definitive diagnosis, but takes one to two weeks for completion and must be carried out in biosafety level III laboratories. The technique involves exposing specific cell lines to samples from whole blood and identifying Chikungunya virus-specific responses. RT-PCR using nested primer pairs is used to amplify several chikungunya-specific genes from whole blood, generating thousands to millions of copies of the genes in order to identify them. RT-PCR can also be used to quantify the viral load in the blood. Using RT-PCR, diagnostic results can be available in one to two days. Serological diagnosis requires a larger amount of blood than the other methods, and uses an ELISA assay to measure chikungunya-specific IgM levels in the blood serum. One advantage offered by serological diagnosis is that serum IgM is detectable from 5 days to months after the onset of symptoms, but drawbacks are that results may require two to three days, and false positives can occur with infection due to other related viruses, such as o'nyong'nyong virus and Semliki Forest virus.

Presently, there is no specific way to test for chronic signs and symptoms associated with Chikungunya fever although nonspecific laboratory findings such as C reactive protein and elevated cytokines can correlate with disease activity.

Prevention

Because no approved vaccine exists, the most effective means of prevention are protection against contact with the disease-carrying mosquitoes and controlling mosquito populations by limiting their habitat. Mosquito control focuses on eliminating the standing water where mosquitos lay eggs and develop as larva; if elimination of the standing water is not possible, insecticides or biological control agents can be added. Methods of protection against contact with mosquitos include using insect repellents with substances such as DEET, icaridin, PMD (p-menthane-3,8-diol, a substance derived from the lemon eucalyptus tree), or ethyl butylacetylaminopropionate (IR3535). However, increasing insecticide resistance presents a challenge to chemical control methods.

Wearing bite-proof long sleeves and trousers also offers protection, and garments can be treated with pyrethroids, a class of insecticides that often has repellent properties. Vaporized pyrethroids (for example in mosquito coils) are also insect repellents. As infected mosquitoes often feed and rest inside homes, securing screens on windows and doors will help to keep mosquitoes out of the house. In the case of the day-active A. aegypti and A. albopictus, however, this will have only a limited effect, since many contacts between the mosquitoes and humans occur outdoors.

Vaccine
, no approved vaccines are available. A phase-II vaccine trial used a live, attenuated virus, to develop viral resistance in 98% of those tested after 28 days and 85% still showed resistance after one year. However, 8% of people reported transient joint pain, and attenuation was found to be due to only two mutations in the E2 glycoprotein. Alternative vaccine strategies have been developed, and show efficacy in mouse models. In August 2014 researchers at the National Institute of Allergy and Infectious Diseases in the USA were testing an experimental vaccine which uses virus-like particles (VLPs) instead of attenuated virus.  All the 25 people participated in this phase 1 trial developed strong immune responses. As of 2015, a phase 2 trial was planned, using 400 adults aged 18 to 60 and to take place at 6 locations in the Caribbean. Even with a vaccine, mosquito population control and bite prevention will be necessary to control chikungunya disease. In 2021, two vaccine manufacturers, one in France, the other in the United States, reported successful completion of Phase II clinical trials.

Treatment
Currently, no specific treatment for chikungunya is available. Supportive care is recommended, and symptomatic treatment of fever and joint swelling includes the use of nonsteroidal anti-inflammatory drugs such as naproxen, non-aspirin analgesics such as paracetamol (acetaminophen) and fluids. Aspirin is not recommended due to the increased risk of bleeding. Despite anti-inflammatory effects, corticosteroids are not recommended during the acute phase of disease, as they may cause immunosuppression and worsen infection.

Passive immunotherapy has potential benefit in treatment of chikungunya. Studies in animals using passive immunotherapy have been effective, and clinical studies using passive immunotherapy in those particularly vulnerable to severe infection are currently in progress. Passive immunotherapy involves administration of anti-CHIKV hyperimmune human intravenous antibodies (immunoglobulins) to those exposed to a high risk of chikungunya infection. No antiviral treatment for Chikungunya virus is currently available, though testing has shown several medications to be effective in vitro.

Chronic arthritis
In those who have more than two weeks of arthritis, ribavirin may be useful. The effect of chloroquine is not clear. It does not appear to help acute disease, but tentative evidence indicates it might help those with chronic arthritis. Steroids do not appear to be an effective treatment. NSAIDs and simple analgesics can be used to provide partial symptom relief in most cases. Methotrexate, a drug used in the treatment of rheumatoid arthritis, has been shown to have benefit in treating inflammatory polyarthritis resulting from chikungunya, though the drug mechanism for improving viral arthritis is unclear.

Prognosis
The mortality rate of chikungunya is slightly less than 1 in 1000. Those over the age of 65, neonates, and those with underlying chronic medical problems are most likely to have severe complications. Neonates are vulnerable as it is possible to vertically transmit chikungunya from mother to infant during delivery, which results in high rates of morbidity, as infants lack fully developed immune systems. The likelihood of prolonged symptoms or chronic joint pain is increased with increased age and prior rheumatological disease.

Epidemiology

Historically, chikungunya has been present mostly in the developing world. The disease causes an estimated 3 million infections each year. Epidemics in the Indian Ocean, Pacific Islands, and in the Americas, continue to change the distribution of the disease.
In Africa, chikungunya is spread by a sylvatic cycle in which the virus largely cycles between other non-human primates, small mammals, and mosquitos between human outbreaks. During outbreaks, due to the high concentration of virus in the blood of those in the acute phase of infection, the virus can circulate from humans to mosquitoes and back to humans. The transmission of the pathogen between humans and mosquitoes that exist in urban environments was established on multiple occasions from strains occurring on the eastern half of Africa in non-human primate hosts. This emergence and spread beyond Africa may have started as early as the 18th century. Currently, available data does not indicate whether the introduction of chikungunya into Asia occurred in the 19th century or more recently, but this epidemic Asian strain causes outbreaks in India and continues to circulate in Southeast Asia. In Africa, outbreaks were typically tied to heavy rainfall causing increased mosquito population. In recent outbreaks in urban centers, the virus has spread by circulating between humans and mosquitoes.

Global rates of chikungunya infection are variable, depending on outbreaks. When chikungunya was first identified in 1952, it had a low-level circulation in West Africa, with infection rates linked to rainfall. Beginning in the 1960s, periodic outbreaks were documented in Asia and Africa. However, since 2005, following several decades of relative inactivity, chikungunya has re-emerged and caused large outbreaks in Africa, Asia, and the Americas. In India, for instance, chikungunya re-appeared following 32 years of absence of viral activity. Outbreaks have occurred in Europe, the Caribbean, and South America, areas in which chikungunya was not previously transmitted. Local transmission has also occurred in the United States and Australia, countries in which the virus was previously unknown. In 2005, an outbreak on the island of Réunion was the largest then documented, with an estimated 266,000 cases on an island with a population of approximately 770,000. In a 2006 outbreak, India reported 1.25 million suspected cases. Chikungunya was introduced to the Americas in 2013, first detected on the French island of Saint Martin, and for the next two years in the Americas, 1,118,763 suspected cases and 24,682 confirmed cases were reported by the PAHO.

An analysis of the genetic code of Chikungunya virus suggests that the increased severity of the 2005–present outbreak may be due to a change in the genetic sequence which altered the E1 segment of the virus' viral coat protein, a variant called E1-A226V. This mutation potentially allows the virus to multiply more easily in mosquito cells. The change allows the virus to use the Asian tiger mosquito (an invasive species) as a vector in addition to the more strictly tropical main vector, Aedes aegypti. Enhanced transmission of Chikungunya virus by A. albopictus could mean an increased risk for outbreaks in other areas where the Asian tiger mosquito is present. A albopictus is an invasive species which has spread through Europe, the Americas, the Caribbean, Africa and the Middle East.

After the detection of zika virus in Brazil in April 2015, the first ever in the Western Hemisphere, it is now thought some chikungunya and dengue cases could in fact be zika virus cases or coinfections.

History
The word 'chikungunya' is believed to have been derived from a description in the Makonde language, meaning "that which bends up", of the contorted posture of people affected with the severe joint pain and arthritic symptoms associated with this disease. The disease was first described by Marion Robinson and W.H.R. Lumsden in 1955, following an outbreak in 1952 on the Makonde Plateau, along the border between Mozambique and Tanganyika (the mainland part of modern-day Tanzania).

According to the initial 1955 report about the epidemiology of the disease, the term 'chikungunya' is derived from the Makonde root verb kungunyala, meaning to dry up or become contorted. In concurrent research, Robinson glossed the Makonde term more specifically as "that which bends up". Subsequent authors apparently overlooked the references to the Makonde language and assumed the term to have been derived from Swahili, the lingua franca of the region. The erroneous attribution to Swahili has been repeated in numerous print sources. Erroneous spellings of the name of the disease are also in common use.

Since its discovery in Tanganyika, Africa, in 1952, Chikungunya virus outbreaks have occurred occasionally in Africa, South Asia, and Southeast Asia, but recent outbreaks have spread the disease over a wider range.

The first recorded outbreak of this disease may have been in 1779. This is in agreement with the molecular genetics evidence that suggests it evolved around the year 1700.

Research
Chikungunya is one of more than a dozen agents researched as a potential biological weapon.

This disease is part of the group of neglected tropical diseases.

See also

 Coalition for Epidemic Preparedness Innovations
 Epidemiology of chikungunya

References

Works cited

External links 
 Chikungunya fact sheet—from the World Health Organization (WHO)
 Chikungunya outbreaks—from the World Health Organization (WHO)
 Togaviridae—from the Virus Pathogen Database and Analysis Resource (ViPR)
 
 Chikungunya in Cuba 
 Chikungunya: The key role of "innate immunity"

 
Biological weapons
Health disasters in India
Tropical diseases